The European Chess Club Cup is an annual chess tournament for club teams from Europe. It is organised by the European Chess Union. The competition is held with the Swiss system over seven rounds. It consists of two sections, open and women's, with each team fielding six and four players respectively at every match.

History
The tournament origins are from the former Yugoslavia, where chess club competitions were quite popular. In 1996, the women's competition was added.

Winners

Men's event
1954  ŠK Partizan
1955  ŠK Partizan
1956  ŠK Partizan
1976  Burevestnik Moscow and  Solingen SG 
1979  Burevestnik Moscow
1982  Spartacus Budapest
1984  Trud Moscow 
1986  CSKA Moscow
1988  CSKA Moscow
1990  CSKA Moscow and  Solingen SG 
1992  Bayern Munich
1993  Lyon Oyonnax
1994  ŠK Bosna &  Lyon Oyonnax
1995  Yerevan city 
1996  Sberbank Tatarstan Kazan
1997  Ladia Azov 
1998  Panfox Breda
1999  ŠK Bosna
2000  ŠK Bosna
2001  Nikel Norilsk 
2002  ŠK Bosna
2003  NAO Paris 
2004  NAO Paris
2005  Tomsk-400 
2006  Tomsk-400 
2007  Linex Magic-Mérida 
2008  Ural Sverdlovskaya oblast
2009  Economist-SGSEU-1 Saratov
2010  Economist-SGSEU-1 Saratov
2011  Saint-Petersburg Chess Federation
2012  SOCAR Azerbaijan
2013  G-Team Nový Bor
2014  SOCAR Azerbaijan
2015  Siberia Novosibirsk
2016  Alkaloid Skopje
2017  Globus Russia
2018  Mednyi Vsadnik St.Petersburg
2019  Obiettivo Risarcimento Padova
2021  Mednyi Vsadnik St.Petersburg
2022  Novy Bor Chess club

Women's event
1996  Agrouniverzal Belgrade and  Merani Tbilisi
1997  Goša Smederevska Palanka
1998  AEM-Luxten Timişoara
1999  Rudenko School Kherson 
2000  Agrouniverzal Belgrade
2001  Agrouniverzal Belgrade
2002  BAS Belgrade 
2003  Internet CG Podgorica 
2004  NTN Tbilisi 
2005  NTN Tbilisi 
2006  Mika Yerevan 
2007  CE Monte Carlo 
2008  CE Monte Carlo 
2009  Spartak Vidnoe
2010  CE Monte Carlo 
2011  AVS
2012  CE Monte Carlo 
2013  CE Monte Carlo
2014  Batumi Chess Club "Nona"
2015  Batumi Chess Club "Nona"
2016  CE Monte Carlo
2017  Batumi Chess Club "Nona"
2018  CE Monte Carlo
2019  Batumi Chess Club "Nona"
2021  South Ural
2022  ASVOe Pamhagen

See also

Chess Olympiad
European Team Chess Championship
Russia (USSR) vs Rest of the World
Women's Chess Olympiad
World Team Chess Championship
World Chess Championship
World Mind Sports Games
Mind Sports Organisation
Correspondence Chess Olympiad

References
. European Club Cup 2009.

Supranational chess championships
Women's chess competitions
Chess in Europe